Virtuoso Guitar is a DVD by Lily Afshar released through Mel Bay on 22 August 2008.

Track listing

Reception 
The album received well: "...by all standards, a remarkable performance "

Personnel 
Lily Afshar - Classical guitar

References

External links
Official website
Myspace page
Facebook page
Last.fm page
Mel Bay Publications

2008 video albums